List of Guggenheim Fellowships awarded in 1994

See also
 Guggenheim Fellowship

References

1994
1994 awards